Acutotyphlops is a genus of blind snakes found in the Philippines, eastern Papua New Guinea and the Solomon Islands. Currently, five species are recognized. The most recently described species was in 2007.

Geographic range
Found in the Philippines, eastern Papua New Guinea and the Solomon Islands.

Species

T) Type species.

Taxonomy
In 2007, a new species was described that is found in the Philippines—more than 4.000 km from the other species of the genus.

References

External links
 

 
Snake genera